Cao Minh may refer to several places in Vietnam, including:

 , a rural commune of Vĩnh Bảo District
 , a rural commune of Phúc Yên
 Cao Minh, Lạng Sơn, a rural commune of Tràng Định District